Roberto Valera Chamizo (b. Havana, 1938) is a Cuban composer and pedagogue that has a made a substantial contribution to the development of music in Cuba.

Academic formation

Roberto Valera initiates its music studies in 1948 with professors Waldina Cortina, Ñola Sahig, José Ardévol, Edgardo Martín and Leo Brouwer in the Municipal Conservatory of Havana, where he also received singing lessons from soprano Zoila Gálvez in 1956. Valera was granted a scholarship from the Cuban government in 1965 to study in Poland with renowned composers Witold Rudzinski and Andrzej Dobrowolski. He also received a degree in education from the Escuela Normal para Maestros in Havana, and a PhD in pedagogy from the University of Havana.

Professional activity

At the request of composer Leo Brouwer, Roberto Valera worked from 1961 to 1965 as a musical advisor at the Instituto Cubano del Arte y la Industria Cinematográficos (ICAIC), starting also a career as a film composer.

After returning from Poland, Valera was appointed as director of The Alejandro García Caturla Conservatory in Marianao, Havana, and in 1968 he became Head of Harmony and Contemporary Techniques at the National School of Arts Music School.

In 1976, Roberto Valera began a long term association with the Instituto Superior de Arte (ISA), serving as Dean and professor of composition, orchestration and contemporary techniques. He also founded the school’s Electroacoustic Music Studio.

Valera has also held different positions on the executive board of Unión Nacional de Escritores y Artistas de Cuba (UNEAC), including a term as President of its Music Section from 1990 to 1992.

Work

Roberto Valera has composed an extensive catalog that includes music for soloists, chamber ensembles orchestra, and choir, as well as for numerous ballets, cartoons and films. Following a select list of Valeras works: The living composers project.

 Orchestral: Devenir, 1969; Concierto por la Paz, saxophone, orchestra, 1985; Extraplan, 1990; Yugo y estrella, 1995; Concierto de Cojimar, guitar, orchestra, 1998; Non divisi, string orchestra, 1999
 Chamber music: String Quartet, 1967; Tres Impertinencias, ensemble, 1971; Tierra de sol, cielo y tierra, ensemble, 1993; Glosas del tiempo recobrado, violin, cello, piano, percussion, 1994
 Choral: Ire a Santiago, mixed chorus, 1969; Cuatro Poemas de Nicolás Guillén, soprano, mixed chorus, orchestra, 2001
 Vocal: Conjuro, soprano, orchestra, 1968
 Piano: Doce Estudios Caribeños, 2002; Van Gogh's Blues Ear, 2002; Cuento Sonoro, 2004
 Electroacoustic: Ajiaco, tape, 1990; Palmas, tape, 1992; Periodo espacial, tape, 1993; Loa del camino, tape, 1999; Las Sombras no Abandonan, tape, 2000

Awards

Among many recognitions, Roberto Valera has received the following:

 First Prize, Competition of the Cuban Ministry of Culture, 1985 (for Concierto por la Paz)
 National Award, UNEAC, 1989 (for his entire oeuvre)
 The Alejo Carpentier Medal
 The Félix Varela Medal
 The National Culture Award of the Cuban Council of the State
 The Ministry of Higher Education has also awarded him for his contribution to Cuban education

Other honors include 

 The Basse Terre Medal in Guadeloupe
 The José Maria Heredia Medal of the province of Santiago (Cuba)
 The Karol Szymanowski Medal of the Polish Ministry of Art and Culture

See also
 Music of Cuba

References

External links

YouTube. Coralina: Iré a Santiago by Roberto Valera. https://www.youtube.com/watch?v=vASXqSS-LEA

YouTube. La lenta noche en tus ojos by Roberto Valera. https://www.youtube.com/watch?v=1k7FUAhysts

Cuban composers
Male composers
1938 births
Living people
Academic staff of the Instituto Superior de Arte
Academic staff of the National Art Schools (Cuba)
Cuban male musicians